Geoffrey Klempner may refer to:
Geoffrey Stephen Klempner, Canadian engineer
Geoffrey Klempner, British philosopher, editor of Philosophy Pathways